German Sikhs are a religious minority in Germany. Many German Sikhs have their roots from the Punjab region in India. They number between 15,000 and 21,000. Germany had the third highest Sikh population in Europe after United Kingdom and Italy.

In the early 21st century, also native Germans have adopted the Sikh Faith. Frankfurt, is also known to the Sikhs, as Mini Punjab, because of a large Sikh population, residing there.

Gurdwaras
Here are a list of some of the Gurdwaras in Germany.

Gurdwara Sri Guru Nanak Sabha, Munich 
Gurdwara Singh Sabha, Augsburg 
Gurdwara Singh Sabha, Berlin 
Gurdwara Shri Guru Darshan Sahib, Bremen
Gurdwara Singh Sabha Duisburg, Moers 
Gurdwara Nanaksar, Essen 
Gurdwara Singh Sabha, Frankfurt am Main 
Gurdwara Singh Sabha, Hamburg 
Singh Sabha Sikh Center, Hamburg 
Gurdwara Sri Guru Nanak Darbar, Hannover 
Gurdwara Singh Sabha, Iserlohn 
Gurdwara Shri Dashmesh Singh Sabha, Cologne
Gurdwara Guru Nanak Parkash, Cologne 
Gurdwara Shri Guru Teg Bahadar Sahib, Cologne 
Gurdwara Guru Shabad Parkash, Cologne
Gurdwara Gurmat Parchar, Leipzig 
Gurdwara Shri Singh Sabha, Mannheim 
Gurdwara Guru Nanak Mission, Nuremberg 
Gurudwara Sri Guru Singh Sabha, Paderborn
Guru Nanak Niwas Gurdwara, Stuttgart 
Gurdwara Sahib, Tübingen
Gurdwara Nanak Darbar, Offenbach am Main

Places with a significant Sikh population
Berlin
Cologne
Frankfurt
Hamburg
Stuttgart

References

External links 
 DISR German information center for Sikh Religion, Sikh History and Culture - DISR website : Information about Sikhism and an updated list of Gurudwaras in Germany, Austria and Switzerland
 deutsches-informationszentrum-sikhreligion
 Die Sikh Religion
 Sikhismus - Erfahren Sie hier alles über den Sikh Glauben von Guru Nanak Dev Sikhism

Religion in Germany
Germany
Ger